Golmaal (2008) is a Bengali comedy drama film directed by Swapan Saha and featuring multi-starring Prosenjit Chatterjee, Tota Ray Chowdhury, Jisshu Sengupta, Priyanka Trivedi, Namrata Thapa, Barsa Priyadarshini.

Plot
Pralay (Prosenjit Chatterjee), an orphan, is given shelter by Kaka Babu (Rajatava Dutt), just like the latter had given to the brother- sister orphans, Mainak (Tota Ray Chowdhury) and Khushi (Barsa Priyadarshini). The three grew up like family members. When they grow up, Pranay falls in love with Chandni (Priyanka Trivedi), the daughter of Tridib Babu (Mrinal Mukherjee), the local don. Pralay and Mainak often clash with Tridib's men and always teach them a lesson. The entry of Sangeeta (Namrata Thapa) creates a misunderstanding between the two, as Mainak has a crush for her, but he learns that Sangeeta loves Pralay. Siddhartha is a college-mate of Khushi. He was not getting any scope of conveying his love for her. Ultimately he joins as manager in the Mainak-Pralay company. But due to some misunderstanding Sangeeta has an impression that Pralay would marry her and Mainak was under impression that Pralay had chosen Chandni as his match. The comedy of errors continues until the entire confusion is cleared.

Cast
 Prosenjit Chatterjee as Pralay
 Tota Ray Chowdhury as Mainak
 Jisshu Sengupta as Siddhartha
 Priyanka Trivedi as Chandni Ghoshal, Pralay's love interest
 Barsa Priyadarshini as Khushi
 Rajatava Dutta as Uncle
 Namrata Thapa as Sangeeta, Mainak's love interest
 Mrinal Mukherjee as Tridib Ghoshal
 Biswanath Basu
 Arpita Becker as Sangeeta's maternal aunty

References

External links
 
 gomolo.in

2008 films
2000s Bengali-language films
Bengali-language Indian films
Bengali remakes of Malayalam films
Films directed by Swapan Saha
Indian comedy-drama films